Zinna is a genus of moths of the family Erebidae. The genus was erected by Francis Walker in 1869.

The Global Lepidoptera Names Index gives this name as a synonym of Ugia Walker, 1858.

Species
Zinna nigripalpis Walker, 1869
Zinna prompta (Walker, 1869)

References

Calpinae